Jakita O. Thomas is a Philpott Westpoint Stevens Associate Professor of Computer Science and Software Engineering at Auburn University. Thomas is one of the co-founders of Pharaoh's Conclave, an organisation helping engage and prepare youth for careers and opportunities related to eSports. Thomas is also a founder of Black ComputeHer which is an organisation dedicated to supporting computing tech education and workforce development for Black women and girls.

Thomas graduated  from Spelman College in 1999 with a Bachelor of Science degree in computer and information science, with a minor in mathematics.  In 2006, she was granted a Ph.D. in computer science and focusing on the learning sciences and technology by the Georgia Institute of Technology in Atlanta, GA, where she was a Presidential Fellow, National Physical Science Consortium Fellow, tutor, mentor, and research assistant.

Awards 
Thomas received the National Science Foundation’s Faculty Early Career Development Award (2012 – 2019). She also received the Presidential Early Career Award for Scientists and Engineers (2016).

Thomas was named one of 1,000 inspiring black scientists in America by Cell Mentor.

Publications

References 

Living people
Computer scientists
Spelman College alumni
Georgia Tech alumni
Auburn University faculty
Year of birth missing (living people)
African-American women scientists